The 2020–21 Tennessee Lady Volunteers basketball team represented the University of Tennessee in the 2020–21 college basketball season. Led by former Lady Vol Kellie Harper, entering her second year as head coach, the team played their games at Thompson–Boling Arena and are members of the Southeastern Conference.

Previous season
The 2019–20 team finished the season 21–10, 10–6 for a third-place tie in SEC play. They lost in the quarterfinals of the SEC tournament to Kentucky.

Preseason

SEC media poll
The SEC media poll was released on November 17, 2020 with the Lady Volunteers selected to finish in sixth place in the SEC.

Preseason All-SEC teams
Rennia Davis was selected to the preseason all-SEC team, her third-straight honor.

Roster

Rankings

^Coaches' Poll did not release a second poll at the same time as the AP.

Schedule

|-
!colspan=9 style=""| Regular season

|-
!colspan=9 style=""| SEC tournament

|-
!colspan=9 style=""| NCAA tournament

References

Tennessee
Tennessee Lady Volunteers basketball seasons
Volunteers
Volunteers
Tennessee